Trechus obtusus is a species of ground beetle in the family Carabidae. It is found in North America, Europe, and Africa.

Subspecies
These six subspecies belong to the species Trechus obtusus:
 Trechus obtusus asturicus Jeannel, 1921
 Trechus obtusus battonii Jeanne & Magrini, 2002
 Trechus obtusus lucanus Focarile, 1949
 Trechus obtusus obtusus Erichson, 1837
 Trechus obtusus sejunctus Leleup, 1945
 Trechus obtusus thracicus Pawlowski, 1973

References

Further reading

External links

 

obtusus
Articles created by Qbugbot
Beetles described in 1837